is a professional Japanese baseball player. He plays pitcher for the Hiroshima Toyo Carp.

External links

1990 births
Living people
Baseball people from Osaka
Japanese baseball players
Nippon Professional Baseball pitchers
Hiroshima Toyo Carp players